The 2016 Gustav Mahler Conducting Competition was the fifth edition of the competition, and it was held in Bamberg from May 6 to 13, 2016 with the Bamberg Symphony. It was won by Singaporean conductor Wong Kah Chun.

Jury
 Jonathan Nott (president)
 Marcus Rudolf Axt
 Jiří Bělohlávek
 Deborah Borda
 Martin Campbell-White
 John Carewe
 Ara Guzelimian
 Barbara Hannigan
 Boris-Alexander Jusa
 Neville Marriner
 Jörg Widmann
 Marina Mahler

Results

Programme

References

External links
 Official website

Gustav Mahler Conducting Competition